Moorooka is a southern suburb in the City of Brisbane, Queensland, Australia.

Geography

Ipswich Road enters the suburb from the north (Annerley) and exits to the south-west (Rocklea). Beaudesert Road splits from Ipswich Road within the suburb and exits to the south (Rocklea).

The Gold Coast railway line passes along part of the western boundary of the suburb, which is serviced by the Moorooka railway station.

The neighbourhood of Moorvale is located around the intersection of Beaudesert Road and Mayfield Road (.

The suburb has mixed uses - large areas, particularly in the elevated eastern side of the suburb are residential.  The lower, western side of the suburb is dominated by retail, particularly motor vehicle dealerships along Ipswich Road, known popularly throughout Brisbane as the "Magic Mile", light industry and warehouses.

Many of the houses are pre-war Queenslanders (on posts, with simple one floor, wooden construction), with small apartment blocks scattered through the suburb. As with many older suburbs of Brisbane, Moorooka is becoming gentrified, with many older homes now being either renovated and extended or replaced by more modern buildings. There are prime real estate areas on the top of hills, with views to the Great Dividing Range over Archerfield in the south, Seventeen Mile Rocks to the west, Mount Coot-tha, St. Lucia, Indooroopilly to the north-west and the city to the north.

History

The area is the traditional lands of the Australian Aboriginal Jagera people who lived there long before British settlement. The area was probably a hunting ground with plentiful food and water. There was also reportedly a Bora ring, which older residents of the area recall being shown. The word Moorooka is an indigenous word, either meaning 'iron bark', referring to the numerous iron bark trees in the area, or 'long nose', referring to Mt Toohey at the suburb's periphery.

The suburb was founded as a stop-over for journeys from Brisbane south (Logan and Albert river valleys) and south-west (Ipswich and beyond).  A section of the suburb's eastern boundary lies adjacent to Toohey Forest Park.

In April 1884, "Fairmount Estate" made up of 128 allotments was advertised to be auctioned by E. Hooker & Son. The Estate covered an area of Moorooka. The classified advertisement for the auction states for sale were '128 choice allotments, being re-subdivisions of subdivisions 1, 2 and 7 of Portion 158, Parish of Yeerongpilly'. Fairmount Estate was described as having, 'close proximity to the city', timber and permanent water 'close at hand', 'splendid quality' soil for gardening, 'no gullies to till up', a 'railway line passing the Estate, which will in a short time be open for traffic', a 'state school close', and a 'Grocer, Draper, Butcher, Baker, Blacksmith, and others already established in business in the locality of the Estate'.

In March 1889, auctioneer W.J. Hooker sold a suburban subdivision called "Moorooka Park Estate", consisting of 329 allotments bounded by Ipswich Road, Spencer Street (now Gainsborough Street), Logan Road (now Beaudesert Road), Johnson Street (now Dinmore Street) and Keats Street. The subdivision was close to the Moorooka railway station (on the western side of Ipswich Road) and was described as having good soil and elevated sites with "no swamps, no gullies, no broken land".

In May 1889, "Moorooka Railway Station Estate", consisting of 82 allotments was advertised to be auctioned by Arthur Martin & Co. A map advertising the auction states the Estate was bounded by Ipswich Road and Yeronga Road (now Fairfield Road). The classified advertisement for the auction states for sale were '80 choice allotments, being part of Portion 125, Parish Yerongpilly'. "Moorooka Railway Station Estate" was described as 'the position is admirable, being only five miles by rail from the city, where train stops every few minutes in the day', and 'takes in a wide scope of most interesting and charming rural and suburban views'.

In June 1920, "Grand View Estate", consisting of 42 allotments was advertised to be auctioned by Cameron Bros and R.G. Watson. A map advertising the auction states the Estate was 'right at the top of the hill within 7 minutes of the Railway Station. The classified advertisement for the auction states for sale were '40 magnificent allotments' which were described as 'adjoining the residence of Thomas Tonks, Esq.'

In July 1927, auctioneers W. Small & Co sold a suburban subdivision called "Dora Vale Estate", consisting of 83 allotments of 24 to 48 perches on Vale Street, Dora Street, Clyde Street and Sinclair and bounded by Main Street (now Gainsborough Street) to the south and Beaudesert Road to the west. The allotments were described as "high and dry and commanding excellent views" and were convenient to the train, tram and bus services with promises that Ipswich Road and Beaudesert Road would soon be sealed with bitumen. Also in July 1927, Clacher Brothers in conjunction with M.J. Trotter sold the "Hollywood Estate", consisting of 24 allotments on the south side of Forrest Street bounded by Fairy Street to the west and an unnamed proposed street (now Vale Street) to the east. In August 1927, the Queensland Development Company sold the "Mayfield Gardens Estate, consisting of 490 allotments (474 residential and 16 commercial) centred around Vendale Avenue and bounded to the west by Beaudesert Road, to the south by Mayfield Road and to the east by Tarragindi Road.

Moorooka State School opened on 28 January 1929.

St Brendan's Catholic Primary School was established on 28 January 1929 by the Sisters of St Joseph.

Between the 1930s and 1969, trams ran along Beaudesert Road, thence along Ipswich Road to the Brisbane CBD.

In 1931, the Annerley Church of Christ commenced outreach in Moorooka, following from the establishment of a Bible school in Clifton Hill in the home of Mr P. Ryan in February 1929. Land was purchased at 108 Beaudesert Road and a church was erected by volunteers held on two successive Saturdays in May 1931, with the church holding its first service on 26 July 1931 with an official opening on Friday 31 July 1931. Initially financially supported by the Annerley church, the Moorooka church became independent in 1933. Since at least 2016, the church has been renamed as the Rising Sun International Church.

In August 1937, auctioneers F.G. Pearce sold a suburban subdivision called Coniston Park Estate, consisting of 96 allotments, bounded by Beaudesert Road, Bracken Street, Margaret Street (now Medina Street) and Sherley Street. The estate was adjacent to Moorooka State School and the Moorooka tram terminus and provided "extensive views with every convenience" including electric light, mains water and gas.

Moorooka has traditionally hosted a working class population stemming from its history as a manufacturing hub during World War II. The southern part of Moorooka bordering Salisbury was the location of government built returned servicemen housing.

Moorooka State Infants School opened on 27 January 1959; it closed on 11 July 1983.

St Mary the Virgin Anglican Church was dedicated on 6 December 1959 by Archbishop Reginald Halse. Its closure on 5 April 1998 was approved by Assistant Bishop Ron Williams.

In 1968, the Brisbane City Council built and opened The Moorooka Bowls Club, which then hosted Queen Elizabeth II on her visit to the 1982 Commonwealth Games. The original bowls club went into receivership in 2019. In 2022 the building's tender was awarded to the not-for-profit organisation The Third Place Group, in order to establish a community space that all Moorookans could enjoy.

The Brisbane City Archives (a collection of local historical records dating back to 1859) was established at Moorooka.

Recently, Moorooka has seen immigrants from various places of the world, including people from the ex-Yugoslavia (Bosnia, Croatia, Serbia), Middle East (Iraq and Iran) and recently people from Africa (Southern Sudan and Eritrea), which has brought an influx of new families into the area.

The median age of the Moorooka population was 35 years of age, three years below the Australian median of 38.  67.7% of people living in Moorooka were born in Australia, compared to the national average of 66.7%. The other top responses for country of birth were New Zealand (3.0%), England (2.6%), India (2.5%), Vietnam (1.0%), Iran (0.8%). 74.2% of people spoke only English at home; the next most popular languages were 1.4% Vietnamese, 1.1% Spanish, 1.1% Punjabi, 1.0% Mandarin, 0.9% Greek.

Heritage listings 
Moorooka has a number of heritage-listed sites, including:
 Sherley Street: Moorooka State School

Education
Moorooka State School is a government primary (Prep-6) school for boys and girls at Sherley Street. In 2017, the school had an enrolment of 341 students with 34 teachers (25 full-time equivalent) and 24 non-teaching staff (17 full-time equivalent). It includes a special education program. It has a strong multi-cultural community and hosts an annual Festival in July.

St Brendan's Primary School is a Catholic primary (Prep-6) school for boys and girls at Hawtree Street. In 2017, the school had an enrolment of 80 students with 15 teachers (10 full-time equivalent) and 13 non-teaching staff (5 full-time equivalent).

There are no secondary schools in Moorooka. The nearest secondary school is Yeronga State High School in Yeronga.

Moorooka is serviced by two kindergartens.

Amenities 
The principal Moorooka shopping district on Beaudesert Road, known as Moorvale, features over 100 businesses from takeaways to restaurants and coffee shops, discount stores, newsagents, dry cleaners, locksmiths, jewellery shop, second hand and pawn shops, and a new range of businesses that serve the African community including food and groceries, hair salons, furniture shops, and halal butcheries.

Moorvale is also known for its extensive Woolworths Supermarket, at the northern end of the shopping district, which was opened in 1972 and was the largest Woolworths in Queensland at the time.

On the south end of Moorooka near the AFL club and Moorooka State School located off Beaudesert Road is Pizza Hut, Shear Image Hair & Beauty, now named Harlequin Hair and a petrol station, and within a few blocks either way convenience stores.

Moorooka has two principal churches, the St Brendan's Roman Catholic Church at Hawtree Street and the Church of Christ at Pampas Street and Beaudesert Road. Both feature Sunday services.

Transport 
Commuter trains on the Beenleigh line stop at Moorooka railway station.

The suburb is served by Brisbane Transport buses, namely the 110 Inala-City server, 116 Rocklea-Moorvale service, the 117 Acacia Ridge-City Valley Service, the 124 Sunnybank-City service, and the 125 Garden City-City Valley service. There is a zone border crossing at the Beaudesert Road shops, popularly known as Moorvale, for transport zones 1 and 2.

Politics
The Moorvale Shopping district hosts office for the Brisbane City Council Councillor for Moorooka Ward Steve Griffiths. The office for the Federal Seat of Moreton is in the nearby suburb of Sunnybank.

References

External links

 
 

 
Suburbs of the City of Brisbane